David Allan (1 April 1965 – 3 July 2012) was a British auto racing driver and Honda test driver. He started his racing career in the National Saloon Car Championship with Synchro Motorsport which he was a key member of, driving a Honda Civic finishing 14th with 16 points. He drove in the series for another two years finishing 10th in 1999 and 14th in 2000 along with entering one race of the Belgian Procar in both years.

For 2001 he made the switch to the British Touring Car Championship driving a Honda Accord in the Production Class eventually finishing 12th in the championship, missing three rounds with Mark Lemmer driving in two. He made a late entry in 2002 racing alongside eventual Production champion James Kaye driving a Honda Civic Type-R. He was outraced by Kaye for most of the season finishing 9th in the championship.

In 2011 he drove in the Dunlop Production GTN Championship driving a Honda Jazz.

At about 11:30 on Tuesday 3 July, he was killed when the car he was testing at Millbrook Proving Ground lost control and rolled several times.

Racing record

Complete British Touring Car Championship results
(key) Races in bold indicate pole position in class (1 point awarded all races) Races in italics indicate fastest lap in class (1 point awarded all races) * signifies that driver lead race for at least one lap in class (1 point awarded just in feature race)

Britcar 24 Hour results

References

1965 births
2012 deaths
British Touring Car Championship drivers
English racing drivers
Britcar 24-hour drivers